The term Convention Parliament has been used to describe the parliaments of:

 Convention Parliament (England), for the English parliaments of 1399, 1660 and 1689
Convention Parliament (1399), for the English Convention Parliament of 1399
Convention Parliament (1660), for the English Convention Parliament of 1660
Convention Parliament (1689) for the English Convention Parliament of 1689–1690
 Irish Convention (1660), sat 2 March and 27 May 1660, and again January 1661
 Convention of Estates of Scotland